Aspronema cochabambae is a species of skink found in Bolivia and Argentina.

References

Aspronema
Reptiles described in 1935
Taxa named by Emmett Reid Dunn